Cane Hill Township is one of 37 townships in Washington County, Arkansas, USA. As of the 2010 census, its unincorporated population was 1,530.

Geography

Cities, towns, villages
Canehill
Clyde

Cemeteries
The township contains eight cemeteries: Canehill, Cox, Kidd, McClellan, New Hope, Reese, Russell, and Yates.

Major routes
 U.S. Route 62
 Arkansas Highway 45

References

 United States Census Bureau 2008 TIGER/Line Shapefiles
 United States National Atlas

External links
 US-Counties.com
 City-Data.com

Townships in Washington County, Arkansas
Populated places established in 1829
Townships in Arkansas